The 1944 NYU Violets football team was an American football team that represented New York University as an independent during the 1944 college football season. 

In their first season under head coach John J. Weinheimer, the Violets compiled a 2–5 record and were outscored 160–71.

The Violets took the field in October 1944 after a two-year absence from the gridiron. NYU officials said they had dropped the sport because of a dip in enrollment during World War II and because the most recent two seasons, 1940 and 1941, had lost $65,000. Students successfully petitioned to bring back the sport.

Not all aspects of the prewar program were restored: head coach Mal Stevens was no longer under contract, and was serving in the Navy Medical Corps. His replacement was John "Jacko" Weinheimer, a 1920s Violets football captain. The schedule no longer featured matchups at Yankee Stadium with big-name programs from across the United States. Instead, NYU faced only smaller colleges in New York City and the Northeast.

The team played its home games at Ohio Field on NYU's University Heights campus in The Bronx borough of New York City.

Schedule

References

NYU
NYU Violets football seasons
NYU Violets football
University Heights, Bronx
Sports in the Bronx